The Princess is a version of the Austin A99 Westminster produced by BMC from 1959 to 1968, latterly under the Vanden Plas marque.

The model was launched in October 1959 under the name Princess 3-litre. From July 1960, these vehicles bore the name Vanden Plas Princess 3-litre, Vanden Plas having become a badge-engineered brand in its own right instead of being known as a coachbuilder for cars of other manufacturers. The 3-litre was superseded by the Vanden Plas Princess 4-litre R in 1964.

The Princess was a great deal smaller and less than 44 per cent of the price of the older Princess IV Saloon, which was also to continue until 1968.

Princess 3-litre

The 3-litre was largely identical to the Pininfarina-designed Austin A99 Westminster and Wolseley 6/99 which used the same  chassis and body.  The Princess was given its own identity with a special Vanden Plas grille (fairly square, with a thick surround and vertical slats), round headlamps, and horn grilles on the front. The interior was lavish in typical Vanden Plas style, featuring burr walnut wood trim, leather seats and panels, and high-quality carpeting. A division between the driver and the rear compartment was an optional extra.  Initially, it was powered by BMC's 3-litre C-Series engine, developing .

The test car cost £1,467 including taxes.

This model was replaced in 1961 by the Vanden Plas Princess 3-litre Mark II. Styling was similar but the wheelbase was two inches (5 cm) longer and anti-roll bars were added to the suspension at both ends of the car. Better brakes were fitted, and interior improvements included built-in drop-down "picnic tables" for the rear seat passengers. Options now included "Smith's air-conditioning".

Engine specifications

This model was discontinued in 1964 and replaced by a new Rolls-Royce powered model.

Vanden Plas Princess R

The Vanden Plas Princess R with its Rolls-Royce all-aluminium 175 bhp engine was announced in August 1964. With an unusually high power to weight ratio the car gave easy cruising at 90+ mph and was capable of 112 mph.

While there were some significant exterior alterations, the big change was under the bonnet where there was a result of more than two years technical collaboration between BMC and Rolls-Royce. The aluminium Rolls-Royce FB60 engine was a short-stroke version of the B series engine: 4, 6 and 8 cylinder units of which more than 30,000 had already been produced. The 6-cylinder engine weighed only . Twin SU carburettors were fitted. Both block and head were aluminium, tappets were hydraulic self-adjusting operating on overhead inlet and side exhaust valves. The counterbalanced crankshaft ran in seven bearings.

The 4-litre R was replete with polished walnut fascia padded top and bottom, hide upholstered seats with fully reclinable backs and polished picnic tables for the rear passengers. A new automatic transmission was provided, Borg-Warner model 8, its first use in a British car and Hydrosteer variable ratio power steering accompanied wider tyres. Externally the fog lamps were moved up by the grille, the hindquarters tidied extended and adjusted to look more substantial and the tailfins replaced by small corner-ridges.

Engine specifications

Pricing

The background to the pricing was that from April 1961 tax relief on company cars was allowed only up to £2,000.

The new car was priced on a par with the curvaceous Jaguar Mark X (albeit only the manual transmission model of the Jaguar) and 50 per cent more than its apparent predecessor the 3-litre car. It was a major change of market positioning aimed at the growing prestige and executive market in Europe and the United States, but its close appearance to its predecessor, its pricing near to that of the Jaguar, which was both bigger, with a far more advanced chassis design, more prestigious though itself without a useful market in the United States, doomed it to failure.

 £1,346 (discontinued Vanden Plas Princess Mark II)
 £1,994 Vanden Plas Princess 4-litre R
 £2,022 Jaguar Mark X
 £5,517 Rolls-Royce Silver Cloud III

Production
Joint production capacity of 12,000 cars a year was provided, (although actual production was never more than a fraction of this)  and final assembly and hand finishing was at the Vanden Plas works in Kingsbury London.

The Vanden Plas Princess 4-litre R remained in production until 1968, just ahead of BMC's merge into British Leyland. 6,687 vehicles were produced at Kingsbury and an additional 312 C.K.D. kits were exported to South Africa bringing total production to 6,999 units. It was the only mass-produced civilian vehicle from another manufacturer ever to use a Rolls-Royce engine.

Rolls-Royce Java

This car was a result of a joint BMC / Rolls-Royce project for a smaller Bentley code-named Java. Prototypes were made using the Austin-engineered central portion of the Vanden Plas, with restyled Rolls-Royce and Bentley panels front and rear. Neither of these models made it into production. Rolls-Royce withdrew from the venture. They had been covering the possibility that the survival of their motor car division might depend on providing a relatively compact mass-produced Rolls-Royce. However 1965's introduction of the Rolls-Royce Silver Shadow was a success.

References

Princess
Luxury vehicles
Cars introduced in 1959
Cars introduced in 1964
Cars discontinued in 1968
Rear-wheel-drive vehicles
Sedans